Since 2009 a number of ships have been attacked by Nigerian pirates.

The pirates are generally believed to be ex-militant members of the Movement for the Emancipation of the Niger Delta who steal crude oil off tanker ships and sell it to buyers on the black market.

In April 2013 the African Union began funding extra security forces and increased security in the Gulf of Guinea but this has had little to no effect on piracy in the region.

Since 2011, over 30 ships have been hijacked and 100 sailors have been kidnapped, including:

2009

2011

2012

2013

2014

2015

2016

2021

References

External links
Foxnews.com
Voanews.com
Ibnlive.in
Vanguardngr.com
Dailyindependentnig.com

Piracy in Nigeria
Ships attacked and captured by pirates
Piracy lists